Events from the year 1552 in India.

Events
 Guru Amar Das becomes third  guru of Sikhism (until 1554)
 Suklenmung's reign as king of Ahom ends with his death (began 1539)
 Sukhaamphaa succeeds his father as king of Ahom (reigns until 1603)

Births

Deaths
 28 March, Guru Angad the second of the Sikh Gurus dies  (born 1504)
 Suklenmung, king of Ahom dies.

See also

 Timeline of Indian history